A Baja jacket (also known as a Mexican Baja hoodie, Baja sweatshirt, or drug rug) is a type of Mexican jacket with a single large pocket on the front, and vents on the side. They are more commonly made out of a coarse woolen fabric known as "jerga". They are often decorated with patterns consisting of horizontal stripes on the sleeves and hood, and vertical stripes down the rest of the jacket. The drawstrings are often flatter and more rectangular than most jacket drawstrings, and always made of the same material as the rest of the jacket. 

They are very popular in the hippie subculture and among fans of post-hair metal.

In the 1970s, Californian surfers brought these hooded shirts back from surf trips to Baja California in Mexico. They became associated with surfers and surfing in Mexican coastal towns and were worn as beachwear in cool weather. The shirts, called "sudadera de jerga" ("cloth sweatshirt") in Mexico, are also traditionally worn by Mexican-American and Mexican youth, especially young men, and can be considered a part of cholo style.

Baja jackets are made with a variety of different materials, often cotton, acrylic and polyester. The fabric can be made from recycled fibers, such as recycled T-shirts. The jackets tend to be somewhat waterproof and fast-drying, making them more suitable for the elements. Some jackets have a soft lining for extra comfort and warmth.

In recent years, they have been adapted to simply become hoodies with some alterations like a zipper running up the middle. Because the striped pattern resembles a Mexican sarape, the Baja jacket is sometimes referred to as a poncho, but the two should not be confused. A poncho is a single piece of fabric with a head opening and sometimes arm openings. However, a poncho does not have sleeves, whereas the Baja jacket does.

References

External links 
 

Hippie movement
Mexican clothing
Surf culture
Tops (clothing)
Tourism in Baja California